von Versen is a German surname. Notable people with the surname include:

Johann Georg Leopold von Versen (1791–1868), German noble and military officer
Maximilian von Versen (1833–1893), German noble and military officer, son of Johann

German-language surnames